Bulgaria is a country in Europe and a member state of the European Union.

Bulgaria may also refer to:

Places
People's Republic of Bulgaria, a former socialist state that existed from 1946-1990
Old Great Bulgaria or Great Bulgaria, a historical country just northeast of the Black Sea
First Bulgarian Empire
Second Bulgarian Empire
Volga Bulgaria, a historical country on the river Volga
Bulgaria (theme), a Byzantine administrative unit
Bulgaria, Cluj-Napoca, a district of Cluj-Napoca, Romania

Ships
Bulgaria (ship), a Russian ship that sank in the Volga
SS Bulgaria (1898), a liner in service 1898–1917
SS Bulgaria (1945), a cargo ship in service 1948–76

Other
Bulgaria (European Parliament constituency)
Bulgaria (fungus), a genus of fungi
2575 Bulgaria, asteroid
Bulgaria national football team, the national football (soccer) team of Bulgaria
Great Uncle Bulgaria, a character in The Wombles

See also
Bogoria (disambiguation)
SS Bulgaria, a list of ships
:Category:National sports teams of Bulgaria for teams called "Bulgaria"
Bulgari (disambiguation)